Pondatti Rajyam is a 1992 Indian Tamil-language drama film directed by K. S. Ravikumar. The film stars Saravanan, Ranjitha, Ravikumar, Raja Raveendar and Chithra.  It was released on 15 August 1992. The film was remade in Telugu as Akka Pettanam Chelleli Kapuram.

Plot

Cast 
 Chinni Jayanth
 K. S. Ravikumar as Friend
 Ranjitha as Bharathi
 Kovai Sarala
 R. Sundarrajan

Production 
The film was initially titled as Malligai Mullai.

Soundtrack 
The music was composed by Deva and lyrics written by Kalidasan.

Reception 
Malini Mannath of The Indian Express wrote, "the direction by K. S. Ravikumar is smooth [..] and the situations are imaginatively handled."

References

External links 
 

1990s Tamil-language films
1992 films
Films directed by K. S. Ravikumar
Films scored by Deva (composer)
Indian drama films
Tamil films remade in other languages